The Banshees of Inisherin is a 2022 black tragicomedy film directed, written, and co-produced by Martin McDonagh. Set on a remote island off the west coast of Ireland, the film follows two lifelong friends (Colin Farrell and Brendan Gleeson) who find themselves at an impasse when one abruptly ends their relationship, with alarming consequences for both of them; Kerry Condon and Barry Keoghan also star. The film received critical acclaim, with particular praise towards McDonagh's direction and screenplay, the performances of the main cast, and Carter Burwell's score. It premiered in competition at the 79th Venice International Film Festival, where Farrell and McDonagh won the awards for Best Actor and Best Screenplay, respectively.

The film received a leading eight nominations at the 80th Golden Globe Awards, the most achieved by any film since Cold Mountain in 2004, winning three: Best Motion Picture – Musical or Comedy, Best Actor – Musical or Comedy (Farrell), and Best Screenplay. It also received nine nominations at the 95th Academy Awards and 28th Critics' Choice Awards, respectively, but went home empty-handed at both ceremonies. The film received ten nominations at the 76th British Academy Film Awards as well, winning four. At the 29th Screen Actors Guild Awards, the film received five nominations, alongside Everything Everywhere All at Once, tying the record for the most nominations previously set by Shakespeare in Love (1998), Chicago (2002), and Doubt (2008); however, it went on to win none of them. It was also named one of the Top Ten Films of 2022 by the National Board of Review.

Accolades

Notes

References

External links
 

Disney-related lists
Banshees of Inisherin, The